Edanyilber José Navas Alayón (born 14 January 2000) is a Venezuelan footballer who plays as a midfielder for Venezuelan Primera División side Aragua F.C.

Club career
Navas made his senior debut in the 2016 Copa Venezuela, and featured as Aragua suffered a shock defeat by Tucanes de Amazonas. He made his league debut in a 1–1 draw with Estudiantes de Mérida.

Career statistics

Club

References

2000 births
Living people
Venezuelan footballers
Association football midfielders
Venezuelan Primera División players
Aragua FC players
21st-century Venezuelan people